John Kette (died 1455) was a Canon of Windsor from 1437 to 1452.

Career

He was appointed:
Sub almoner of King Henry VI
Rector of St Nicholas ad Macellas 1437 - 1455
Prebendary of Holborn in St Paul’s Cathedral 1444 - 1455
Prebendary of St Stephen’s, Westminster 1448
Rector of Shepperton 1452 - 1455
 
He was appointed to the seventh stall in St George's Chapel, Windsor Castle in 1437, and held the stall until 1452.

Notes 

1455 deaths
Canons of Windsor
Year of birth missing